Michèle Morgan (née Simone Renée Roussel; 29 February 1920 – 20 December 2016) was a French film actress, who was a leading lady for three decades in both French cinema and Hollywood features. She is considered to have been one of the great French actresses of the 20th century. Morgan was the inaugural winner of the Best Actress Award at the Cannes Film Festival. In 1992, she was given an honorary César Award for her contributions to French cinema.

Early life
Morgan was born Simone Renée Roussel in Neuilly-sur-Seine, Hauts-de-Seine, a wealthy suburb of Paris. She grew up in Dieppe, Seine-Maritime, France.

Career
Morgan left home at the age of 15 for Paris determined to become an actress. She took acting lessons from René Simon while serving as an extra in several films to pay for her drama classes. It was then that she took the stage name "Michèle Morgan". She argued that she did not have the body type of a Simone, and "Morgan" sounded more Hollywood-friendly.

Morgan was first noticed by director Marc Allégret, who offered her a major role in the film Gribouille (1937), opposite Raimu. Then came Le Quai des brumes (1938) directed by Marcel Carné (1938), opposite Jean Gabin, and Remorques (1941) directed by Jean Grémillon.

Upon the invasion of France in 1940 by the Germans, Morgan left for the United States and Hollywood where she was contracted to RKO Pictures in 1941. Her career there proved rather disappointing, apart from Joan of Paris (1942) opposite Paul Henreid, and Higher and Higher (1943) opposite Frank Sinatra. She was tested and strongly considered for the female lead in Casablanca but RKO would not release her for the amount of money that Warner Bros. offered. Morgan did work for Warners, however, in Passage to Marseille (1944) with Humphrey Bogart.

After the war, Morgan returned to France and quickly resumed her career with the film La Symphonie Pastorale (1946) directed by Jean Delannoy, which earned her the Best Actress award at the Cannes Film Festival. Her other films from this period include; Carol Reed's The Fallen Idol (1948), Fabiola (1949), The Proud and the Beautiful (1953) by Yves Allégret, Les Grandes Manœuvres (1955) by René Clair and Marie-Antoinette reine de France (1956). She continued working in films throughout the 1960s, such as in Lost Command (1966), a version of Les Centurions. In the 1970s, she virtually retired from her acting career, then made only occasional appearances in film, television and theatre.

For her contribution to the motion picture industry, Morgan has a star on the Hollywood Walk of Fame at 1645 Vine Street. In 1969, the government of France awarded her the Légion d'Honneur. For her long service to the French motion picture industry, in 1992 she was given an Honorary César Award. In 1996, she also received the Career Golden Lion for lifetime achievement at the Venice Film Festival.

Morgan took up painting in the 1960s. She had a solo exhibition, "Artistes En Lumière à Paris", from 2 March to 30 April 2009, at the Espace Cardin in Paris. In 1977 she released her memoir, titled With Those Eyes (Avec ces yeux-là).

Personal life and death
While in Hollywood, Morgan married William Marshall (1917–1994), in 1942, with whom she had a son, Mike Marshall (1944–2005). Morgan had built and owned a house at 10050 Cielo Drive. Morgan and Marshall divorced in 1948. She married French actor Henri Vidal (1919–1959) in 1950. She remained with him until his death in 1959. She then lived with film director and actor/writer Gérard Oury until his death in 2006.

Morgan died on 20 December 2016, aged 96, in Meudon, France of natural causes. Her funeral was held at the Église Saint-Pierre in Neuilly-sur-Seine on 23 December 2016, and she was buried at the Montparnasse Cemetery.

Despite living to the age of 96, she technically only had 24 birthdays due to being born on 29 February.

Filmography

Trivia 
The former President of Chile Michelle Bachelet was named after Michèle Morgan.

References

Further reading

External links

 
 
 Michèle Morgan at filmsdefrance.com
 
 Photographs of Michèle Morgan
 Michèle Morgan (Aveleyman)

1920 births
2016 deaths
Cannes Film Festival Award for Best Actress winners
César Honorary Award recipients
People from Neuilly-sur-Seine
People from Dieppe, Seine-Maritime
Actresses from Los Angeles
French expatriate actresses in the United States
French film actresses
French memoirists
Grand Officiers of the Légion d'honneur
20th-century French actresses
Officers of the Ordre national du Mérite
RKO Pictures contract players
Burials at Montparnasse Cemetery
French women memoirists
21st-century American women